Parvaneh Salahshouri is an Iranian sociologist and reformist politician who is a former member of the Parliament of Iran representing Tehran, Rey, Shemiranat and Eslamshahr electoral district.

She currently heads the Women's fraction.

Career

Electoral history

Views 
After the elections, a video interview surfaced in English in which she stated that hijab should be a "matter of choice for women", referring to mandatory hijab laws. She later corrected her markings, saying "women might prefer to wear the black chador while others would prefer a headscarf and long coat".

In one her speeches in parliament she criticized the "objectionable governance of the country and grim despotism and the ever-increasing powers of parallel, unelected centers of power." 

After the  Iranian protests over petrol price increases in November 2019, Salahshouri was one of the few Iranian politicians to speak out against the heavy crackdown on the protesters. She disclosed that several children among the protesters had been shot dead by the security forces. On the floor of the Majlis she denounced the military's influence on the government's decisions, and asked rhetorically, "How can I, as a representative of the people, watch the murder of my country's young?" She was "accosted and harassed for days" after remarks according to journalist Dexter Filkins. 

On 9 December 2019, Salahshouri announced she would not be running for re-election for parliament/majlis   in protest against the Islamic Republic's response to the protests.

References

1964 births
Living people
People from Masjed Soleyman
Bakhtiari people
Iranian sociologists
Academic staff of the Islamic Azad University
Members of the 10th Islamic Consultative Assembly
Members of the Women's fraction of Islamic Consultative Assembly
Assembly of Graduates of Islamic Iran politicians
Iranian women's rights activists